The 2020–21 Nemzeti Bajnokság I/B is the 54th season of the Nemzeti Bajnokság I/B, the second tier handball league in Hungary. This season the competition is being contested by 20 clubs split geographically across two groups of 10 teams, which began on 10 September 2021 and will conclude in 19 June 2022.

Teams

Team changes

Western Group

Eastern Group

Regular season

Western Group

Standings

Schedule and results
In the table below the home teams are listed on the left and the away teams along the top.

Eastern Group

Standings

Schedule and results
In the table below the home teams are listed on the left and the away teams along the top.

Play-offs

Promotion round
The top five teams advanced from the Western- and Eastern Group of the regular season.

Standings

Schedule and results
In the table below the home teams are listed on the left and the away teams along the top.

Relegation round
The bottom five teams advanced from the Western- and Eastern Group of the regular season.

Standings

Schedule and results
In the table below the home teams are listed on the left and the away teams along the top.

See also
 2021–22 Magyar Kupa
 2021–22 Nemzeti Bajnokság I
 2021–22 Nemzeti Bajnokság II

References

External links
 Hungarian Handball Federaration 

Handball leagues in Hungary
Nemzeti Bajnoksag I/B Men